Rear-Admiral William Pierrepont (March 1766 – 7 August 1813) was a Royal Navy officer of the late eighteenth century who is best known for his service in the  French Revolutionary Wars as a commander of the frigate [[HMS Naiad (1797)|HMS Naiad]], in which he commanded the British squadron at the action of 16 October 1799 off Vigo, in which one of the largest hauls of prize money ever captured was distributed following the seizure of a Spanish treasure convoy. Pierrepont's career was later hindered by poor health, although he served in large warships through much of the Napoleonic Wars.

Life
Pierrepont was born in March 1766 to Charles and Mary Pierrepont of Uffington in Lincolnshire. He joined the Royal Navy in the 1780s and was commissioned as a lieutenant in 1789, serving on HMS Leander, HMS Inconstant and HMS Boyne. On the latter, he participated in Sir John Jervis's 1794 campaign in the West Indies at the start of the French Revolutionary Wars and was promoted to command the cutter HMS Seaflower, subsequently being promoted to commander and then post captain.<ref name="NMM">National Maritime Museum, Captain William Pierrepont, 1766–1813</ref>

During 1795–1796 Pierrepont commanded the frigates HMS Brilliant and HMS Blonde before taking over the newly built HMS Naiad in 1797. It was in Naiad that he achieved a number of successes against French privateers and small warships, including the capture of the en flute frigate Decade in 1798. In October 1799, while patrolling off Cape Finisterre, Pierrepont spotted and chased two Spanish ships, and although Naiad was unable to catch either one, other patrolling frigates, acting under Pierrepont's direction, were able to bring the Spanish force to battle and defeat it at the action of 16 October 1799. On board was found a cargo of more than two million silver dollars, worth at least £618,040 (the equivalent of £ as of ).

Ill health forced a temporary retirement in 1800, although he saw shore service in 1803 and returned to sea in 1807 as captain of HMS Zealous. He married in 1797 and had five children at his stately home of Farley Hill near Godalming in Surrey, where he died aged 46 in August 1813, less than a year after his promotion to rear-admiral.

Notes

References

1766 births
1813 deaths
Royal Navy rear admirals
Royal Navy personnel of the Napoleonic Wars
Royal Navy personnel of the French Revolutionary Wars
People from Uffington, Lincolnshire